Imbokodvo National Movement (INM) was a political party in Swaziland (since 2018 renamed to Eswatini) that existed from 1964 until 1973 when political parties were banned. The party was formed by the Swazi National Council, which was the advisory body to King Sobhuza II. It won the first democratic election in Swaziland held in 1967. The party also won the second parliamentary election in 1972. The INM effectively ceased to exist after the banning of political parties in 1973 after the annulment on the constitution and the introduction of a decree in the country.

Electoral history

House of Assembly elections

References

1964 establishments in Swaziland
1973 disestablishments in Swaziland
Banned political parties
Defunct political parties in Eswatini
Monarchist parties
Political parties disestablished in 1973
Political parties established in 1964